Baccalà alla lucana is a traditional dish from Basilicata in southern Italy,  particularly widespread in the area of the comune of Avigliano and therefore also known as baccalà all'aviglianese. A typical Christmas dish, it is made of cod and crunchy red peppers known as cruschi.

See also
 Cuisine of Basilicata
 List of fish dishes

External links
Brief history
Recipe

Italian seafood dishes
Cuisine of Basilicata